GC may stand for:

Computing
 Garbage collection (computer science), a form of automatic memory management
 GenerativeComponents, computer-aided design software
 Global Catalog, a global listing of all objects in an Active Directory forest
 General Category of a Unicode symbol, see Unicode character property#General Category
 gc, the Go compiler

Entertainment
 GC (character), a fictitious cat on 1980s Mexican television
 The GC, a New Zealand television series
 GameCube, a home video game console
 Games Convention, an annual video games event held in Leipzig, Germany
 Good Charlotte, American rock band

People
 Gemma Collins (born 1981), an English media personality and businesswoman.

Organizations
 Grasshopper Club Zürich, a Swiss sports club
 Green Council, an environmental organization based in Hong Kong
 Gurkha Contingent of the Singapore Police Force
 Guardia Civil (Civil Guard (Spain)), the civil guard or gendarmerie in Spain
 , Actuarial Association of Europe, established in 1978
 Grinnell College, a private liberal arts college in Grinnell, Iowa

Science
 GC (gene), encodes the vitamin D-binding protein also known as gc-globulin
 gc, a unit conversion factor used in engineering
 GC-content, a sequence composition of DNA molecules in genetics
 Gallocatechol, a plant polyphenol molecule
 Gas chromatography, in analytical chemistry
 Germinal center, an area in a lymph node
 Gigacoulomb, an SI symbol for electric charge equal to 109 coulomb
 Granular component, a component of the nucleolus
 Guanylate cyclase, an enzyme catalysing the synthesis of cyclic-GMP from GTP
 Neisseria gonorrhoeae or gonococcus, the causative agent of gonorrhea
 Clayey gravel, in the Unified Soil Classification System
 Crystallized intelligence (abbreviated Gc), a part of fluid and crystallized intelligence
 Library of Congress Classification:Class G, subclass GC -- Oceanography
 Genetic Counselor, health professionals who primarily counsel individuals on risks related to various hereditary diseases.
 GC, star designation from the Boss General Catalogue

Transportation
 Gambia International Airlines (IATA code), the national airline of the Gambia
 Georgia Central Railway, a class III railroad in Georgia, United States
 Grand Central, a railway operator in England
 Gibraltar to Casablanca convoy (convoy code GC) in World War II
 GC, Mazda's first front-wheel drive midsize car platform
 GC, ID code for the first generation Subaru Impreza sedan

Other
 gc (digraph), in some languages
 Gender critical, alternate term for Trans-exclusionary radical feminism
 George Cross, the highest civil decoration of the United Kingdom
 Glivenko–Cantelli theorem, in probability
 Gigacycles per second (Gc), an older term for gigahertz
 GC, the DIN code for pigment-coated, virgin mechanical pulp paperboard
 General contractor is sometimes abbreviated as this.
 geocaching, a technology-based outdoor activity
 Golden Corral, American restaurant chain.